Carlo Valdes (born February 11, 1990) is an American bobsledder. He competed in the four-man event at the 2018 Winter Olympics. Valdes graduated from UCLA in 2013 with a B.A. in History. At UCLA, he played wide receiver in football until his transition to track and field, where he competed as a decathlete. He mainly competed in Javelin for the rest of his time at UCLA. His father is of Mexican descent.

He qualified to represent the United States at the 2022 Winter Olympics.

References

External links
 

1990 births
Living people
American male bobsledders
Olympic bobsledders of the United States
Bobsledders at the 2018 Winter Olympics
Bobsledders at the 2022 Winter Olympics
American sportspeople of Mexican descent
UCLA Bruins football players
UCLA Bruins men's track and field athletes
Sportspeople from Newport Beach, California